Pakhomovo is a rural locality (a village) in Yenangskoye Rural Settlement, Kichmengsko-Gorodetsky District, Vologda Oblast, Russia. The population was 38 as of 2002.

Geography 
Pakhomovo is located 53 km east of Kichmengsky Gorodok (the district's administrative centre) by road. Nizhny Yenangsk is the nearest rural locality.

References 

Rural localities in Kichmengsko-Gorodetsky District